On the back of the success of the album, Made in England, Elton John went out on tour to promote it. The 1995 leg of the tour covered fifteen European countries, but strangely missing out John's homeland of the United Kingdom. John with his band then crossed the Atlantic Ocean for an extensive tour of the United States, playing forty-two concerts in just under three months, including seven sold out concerts at New York City's legendary Madison Square Garden, which has become a staple venue for any Elton John tour.

Setlists

Tour dates

Setlists

Box office score data

Tour band 
Elton John–Piano and vocals
Davey Johnstone–Musical director, Electric and acoustic guitars, banjo, mandolin, backing vocals
Guy Babylon–Keyboards, backing vocals
Bob Birch–Bass guitar, backing vocals
Ray Cooper–Percussion
John Jorgenson–electric and acoustic guitars, saxophone, backing vocals
Charlie Morgan–Drums
David Paton–Fill-in Bass Guitar

Notes

References

External links

 Information Site with Tour Dates

Elton John concert tours
1995 concert tours